Suan Son Pradiphat is a sand beach in Tambon Nong Kae, Hua Hin District, Prachuap Khiri Khan Province, Thailand. Suan Son Pradiphat is regarded as another popular and well-known marine attraction in Hua Hin, it is about 9 km (5.5 mi) south of town of Hua Hin. Khao Takiab hill bisected between these two areas.

Its name literally translates as "oak pine garden", because there are many this species of pines in the area.

The beach is located in a military zone under supervision by Infantry Center, Royal Thai Army (RTA), therefore, it is a quiet and less crowded beach compared to other beaches of Hua Hin or Prachuap Khiri Khan. There are restaurant, food court, coffee shop, restroom, and bathroom service, or for who wants to stay overnight, there are accommodations service as well.  Along the beach is shady with oak pines. There are provided for rental service of tables, beach chairs, umbrellas for visitors. A Bryde's whale skeleton is displayed at the entrance to the beach.

Suan Son Pradiphat is easily accessible via Petchkasem Road (Highway 4). Rajabhakti Park is only 2 km (1.2 mi) from here, with Petchkasem Road in the middle.

An excursion train service from Bangkok terminates here every Saturday–Sunday and public holidays.

References

Beaches of Thailand
Tourist attractions in Prachuap Khiri Khan province